Puerto Rico competed at the 2004 Summer Paralympics in Athens, Greece. The team included two athletes. Competitors from Puerto Rico won one bronze medal to finish 73rd in the medal table.

Medallists

Sports

Athletics

Men's field

Shooting

Women

See also
Puerto Rico at the Paralympics
Puerto Rico at the 2004 Summer Olympics

References 

Nations at the 2004 Summer Paralympics
2004
Summer Paralympics